Jacqueline Dubrovich (born July 18, 1994) is an American foil fencer.

Born in Paterson, New Jersey, Dubrovich was raised in Riverdale, New Jersey, and now lives in Maplewood, New Jersey, and is Jewish. She attended Pompton Lakes High School. She graduated from Columbia University in 2016 with degrees in Psychology, Human Rights, and Russian Literature and Culture.

She participated in the 2019 World Fencing Championships, winning a bronze medal.

She represented the United States at the 2020 Summer Olympics.

She competed at the 2022 World Fencing Championships held in Cairo, Egypt.

References

External links

1994 births
Living people
American female foil fencers
Pompton Lakes High School alumni
Sportspeople from Morris County, New Jersey
Sportspeople from Paterson, New Jersey
People from Maplewood, New Jersey
Columbia Lions fencers
Pan American Games medalists in fencing
Pan American Games gold medalists for the United States
Fencers at the 2019 Pan American Games
World Fencing Championships medalists
Medalists at the 2019 Pan American Games
Columbia College (New York) alumni
Fencers at the 2020 Summer Olympics
Olympic fencers of the United States
21st-century American women
Jewish female foil fencers
Jewish American sportspeople